The Fuelleborn's labeo (Labeo fuelleborni) is an African species of freshwater fish in the family Cyprinidae. It is found in Burundi and Tanzania in the Lake Rukwa basin, Lake Tanganyika and the Malagarasi River. Its natural habitats are rivers, freshwater lakes, and inland deltas. Its status is insufficiently known.

References

Labeo
Fish described in 1903
Taxonomy articles created by Polbot